Ghanaian Australians are Australian citizens and residents of Ghanaian origin and descent. More than 50% of those who are Ghana-born live in Sydney.

Background
The Special Commonwealth African Assistance Plan allowed students from West African countries, including from Ghana, to come to Australia the mid-1960s. More than 70 per cent of these students remained in Australia following military coups in their countries. While small in number, the Ghana-born steadily increased from the mid-1970s following the easing of immigration restrictions. The majority of Ghanaian Australians are skilled and educated, with 70.6% of the Ghana-born aged 15 years and over possessing higher non-school qualifications, compared to 55.9% of the Australian population.

Population
The 2011 Census noted there were 3,866 Ghana-born people in Australia. Akan, Ewe and Ga all have many speakers in Australia. Akan has over 2,100 speakers and Ewe has over 400 speakers. Some of the over 10,700 Australian-born who speak an African language may also speak a Ghanaian language.

It was noted in 2014 that the Ghanaian student population in Australia (like the Nigerian one) was growing fast to the extent that Australian universities were keen to attract more students from Ghana.

African restaurants serving up Ghanaian specialties can be found in Sydney.

Ghanaian Australians
 Manu Crooks - Artist
 Faustina Agolley – TV presenter and host
 Kwabena Appiah-Kubi – soccer player for Western Sydney Wanderers
 Selasi Berdie – professional rugby league footballer for the Gold Coast Titans
 Kofi Danning – soccer player who has played for Australia internationally
 Dorinda Hafner – celebrity chef, community activist and TV personality
 Nuala Hafner – news reader and TV personality
 Miracle – rapper
 Matt Okine – Triple J host, actor, comedian, The Project regular; of Ghanaian descent
 Kwame Yeboah – soccer player
 Isaac Quaynor- AFL footballer

References

Ethnic groups in Australia
Australia
African Australian